Khasanboy Rakhimov is an Uzbekistani freestyle wrestler. He won one of the bronze medals in the men's 125 kg event at the 2019 World Wrestling Championships but his medal was stripped as he tested positive for a banned substance. He would have been scheduled to represent Uzbekistan at the 2020 Summer Olympics in Tokyo, Japan, but the Olympic quota for that spot was given to a runner up.

He also won first place in the 2019 Medved International competition.

In 2022, he competed at the Yasar Dogu Tournament held in Istanbul, Turkey.

He won the bronze medal in the men's 125 kg event at the 2021 Islamic Solidarity Games held in Konya, Turkey. He competed in the 125kg event at the 2022 World Wrestling Championships held in Belgrade, Serbia.

Achievements

References

External links 
 

Living people
Year of birth missing (living people)
Place of birth missing (living people)
Uzbekistani male sport wrestlers
World Wrestling Championships medalists
Doping cases in wrestling
Uzbekistani sportspeople in doping cases
Islamic Solidarity Games competitors for Uzbekistan
Islamic Solidarity Games medalists in wrestling
21st-century Uzbekistani people